This is a list of airports in the Republic of the Congo, sorted by location.

See also 
 Transport in the Republic of the Congo
 List of airports by ICAO code: F#FC - Republic of the Congo (ROC), formerly known as Congo
 Wikipedia: WikiProject Aviation/Airline destination lists: Africa#Congo

References

External links 
 Lists of airports in the Republic of the Congo:
 Great Circle Mapper
 Aircraft Charter World
 World Aero Data
 HotelsTravel.com

Congo, Republic of the
 
Airports
Airports
Congo, Republic of the